Lyle Bauer (born August 22, 1958, in Saskatoon, Saskatchewan) is the former president and chief operating officer of the Calgary Stampeders and is a former Canadian Football League offensive lineman who played ten seasons in the CFL, all for Winnipeg.

In 1988, Bauer was named the Blue Bombers Most Outstanding Lineman. He was part of the Grey Cup championship-winning Winnipeg Blue Bombers in 1984, 1988, 1990.  In 1998, he was inducted into the Blue Bomber Hall of Fame.

Bauer resigned as the president and chief executive officer of the Blue Bombers on Dec 17th, 2009. A CFL source confirmed that he was going to be taking over the job of president of the Calgary Stampeders. During his executive career the Blue Bombers played in the Grey Cup 4 times, 1992, 1993, 2001, and 2007.

In January 2010, the Calgary Stampeders announced that Bauer would be their new chief operating officer and president.  He held these positions for three years, resigning in January 2013.

References 

1958 births
Canadian football offensive linemen
Living people
Sportspeople from Saskatoon
Players of Canadian football from Saskatchewan
Saskatchewan Huskies football players
Weber State Wildcats football players
Winnipeg Blue Bombers general managers
Winnipeg Blue Bombers players
Chief operating officers